Cyril Solomon (11 March 1911 – 15 July 1995) was an Australian cricketer. He played thirteen first-class matches for New South Wales between 1931/32 and 1939/40.

See also
 List of New South Wales representative cricketers

References

External links
 

1911 births
1995 deaths
Australian cricketers
New South Wales cricketers
Cricketers from Sydney